Ricardo Froilán Lagos Escobar (born 2 March 1938) is a Chilean lawyer, economist and social-democratic politician who served as president of Chile from 2000 to 2006. During the 1980s he was a well-known opponent of the Chilean military dictatorship and astounded contemporaries in 1988 by openly denouncing dictator Augusto Pinochet on live television. He served as Minister of Education from 1990 to 1992 and Minister of Public Works from 1994 to 1998 under president Eduardo Frei Ruiz-Tagle before narrowly winning the 1999-2000 presidential election in a runoff against Independent Democrat Union (UDI) candidate Joaquín Lavín. Lagos was the third president from the center-left Coalition of Parties for Democracy to have governed Chile since 1990. He was succeeded on 11 March 2006 by Socialist Michelle Bachelet, from the same coalition. From 2007 to 2010 he served as a Special Envoy on Climate Change for the United Nations Secretary-General Ban Ki-moon. Lagos made an unsuccessful bid to run for president in the 2017 Chilean general election.

Early years
Lagos was born in Santiago, Chile. He was the only child of Froilán Lagos Sepúlveda (a farmer who died when his son was eight years old) and Emma Escobar Morales (who died in 2005). He attended primary school at Liceo Experimental Manuel de Salas and high school at the prestigious Instituto Nacional.

In 1961, Lagos married Carmen Weber, with whom he had two children, Ricardo and Ximena. In 1969, he met Luisa Durán and they married in 1971. The couple shared the parenting of the children of Lagos' first marriage, the children of Durán's first marriage, Hernán and Alejandro, and their only child together, Francisca.

While in university Ricardo Lagos attended the lectures of historian Jaime Eyzaguirre whom he held in high esteem.

Academic and diplomatic career

After obtaining his law degree from the University of Chile in 1960, Lagos pursued a Ph.D. in Economics from Duke University, which he completed in 1966. During that time he became a visiting professor at the University of North Carolina at Chapel Hill political science department until 1965. After his time in North Carolina, he maintained ties with both universities. On his return to Chile, he was employed at the Institute of Economy of the University of Chile directed by Carlos Massad. In 1967, he was named Director of the School of Political and Administrative Sciences, a position he held until 1973, when he became Secretary General of the University of Chile. Lagos subsequently began work as a professor of economics in the School of Law at the University of Chile, and between 1971 and 1972 he was Director of the Institute of Economy. He was later named Director of the Latin American Council of Social Sciences.

During the 1970s, Lagos declared himself an "independent of the left" and abandoned the Radical Party of Chile, which he had joined in 1961, when this party supported Jorge Alessandri's government. Although he did not possess much diplomatic experience, he worked with Hernán Santa Cruz as the Chilean delegates to the United Nations and presented an outstanding speech on the international financial crisis. During the speech, he strongly criticized the decision of U.S. President Richard Nixon to suspend the convertibility of the U.S. dollar into gold, a measure that would end in the rounding up the Asian crisis. In 1972, President Salvador Allende appointed Lagos as the Chilean ambassador to the Soviet Union in Moscow, but the appointment was never ratified by Congress. As a Regional Director of the training program of post graduate studies in social sciences, he was later put in charge of Project UNESCO, of the United Nations Development Programme (UNDP) in Buenos Aires. As a public servant he also served Chile as a United Nations delegate with rank of ambassador at the 26th United Nations General Assembly. In addition, he was a delegate to the UN's 3rd Conference of Commerce and Development (United Nations Conference on Trade and Development).

Soon after the 1973 coup d'état, he and his family were sent into exile in Buenos Aires, Argentina, where he took the position of Secretary General of the Latin American Faculty of Social Sciences (FLACSO). He moved for a year to the United States, where he became visiting professor of the William R. Kenan chair for Latin American Studies at the University of North Carolina at Chapel Hill. In 1975, he worked as a consultant for the United Nations Development Programme.

Lagos returned to Chile in 1978, and worked for the Regional Program of Employment of the United Nations, PREALC. During the implementation of policies imposed by the International Monetary Fund his mission was to advise all the governments in the South American continent on the matter of employment.

Political career
During the 1980s, Lagos assumed a fundamental role in the fight for the recovery of democracy. In addition to being one of the leaders of the Socialist Party of Chile, he became President of the Democratic Alliance, a force that grouped the majority of the democratic parties opposing the dictatorship of General Augusto Pinochet. In 1983, he decided to leave his position as international civil employee in the United Nations. In December of that year, he became president of the Democratic Alliance. In 1987, as the president of the Committee of the Left for Free Elections, he called on all citizens and parties to enroll  in the electoral registries to vote "no" in a 1988 national plebiscite on whether Pinochet should be allowed to remain president of Chile.

Lagos became the undisputed leader of Pinochet's opponents after appearing in Canal 13's first political debate show since the 1973 coup d'état, De cara al país (towards the country), where he stated; "With the triumph of "No", the country will prevent General Pinochet from being 25 years in power, it will mark the start of the end of the dictatorship." Lagos then looked directly into the camera and accusingly raised his index finger to say directly to all viewers: 

To this day, in Chile the phrase "Lagos' finger" refers to this memorable event; on that night, many people were convinced he would not survive to see the next day.

After the triumph of the No alternative and the subsequent resignation of Pinochet, Lagos declined to be a candidate for the presidency in spite of being the main leader of the opposition. Instead, he supported Patricio Aylwin's candidacy and ran for a seat in the Senate for the Santiago-West district. On December 11, 1989, the day of the elections, he obtained the district's second majority. Nevertheless, he did not win a seat because his alliance's list did not double the vote of the second most voted list; this being a requisite in the Chilean electoral system created by Pinochet.
                                                                
In 1990, Lagos was named Minister of Education by President Patricio Aylwin. In this position, he initiated reform aimed at increasing equality in access and improving education levels. In June 1993, he pushed for the notion of using primary elections in order to select the Concertación coalition's candidate for the following presidential election. He lost this primary to Eduardo Frei Ruiz-Tagle, who went on to become President of Chile. In 1994, Frei himself named Lagos Minister of Public Works. In this role, he developed an innovating system of road concessions, integrated the private sector in the construction of works and its later operation. During the Frei administration, he continued to be a leader of opinion and was a sure option for the following presidential election. His status was later ratified by his appointment as one of the members of the Committee of Twelve Distinguished Members of the Socialist International, which he shared with such personalities as Felipe González and Gro Harlem Brundtland. This committee was set up to process proposals for the renovation of the social democratic thought for the 21st century.

In 1999, Lagos resigned as minister in order to begin his presidential campaign. In the primaries, he defeated senator Andrés Zaldívar, of the Christian Democratic Party to become the Concertación's sole presidential candidate. In the first round of the presidential election in December of the same year, he defeated right-wing candidate Joaquín Lavín, by only 30,000 votes. Since he failed to obtain an absolute majority, as is required to be elected president, a presidential runoff was subsequently held in January 2000 for the first time ever in Chile. Winning 51.3 percent of the vote, Lagos became the new President of Chile.

Presidency (2000–2006)

Internal issues

During the first year of his term in office, Lagos had to confront a high level of unemployment, generated by the political instability of the region, in a process that began to revert during the end of 2003. He also promised to keep the budget deficit in check and interest rates and inflation low. Lagos enjoyed great popular support, bordering on 55%, and ending around 60-70% during the last six months of his term. He left office with an approval rating of 75%, a historic level of support for any politician in Post-Pinochet Chile. The policy of proximity with people was pronounced in the opening of the doors of the Palacio de La Moneda, that had remained closed since the 1973 coup d'état. Lagos's lowest approval rating in office was 45%, a solid approval rating for any Chilean politician post-Pinochet.

On 3 April 2001, with a 63-37-4 vote, the Chamber of Deputies of Chile approved a bill to abolish the death penalty in Chile for civilian crimes and set the maximum punishment at life imprisonment. The politicians who rejected the bill belonged to right-wing Chilean parties. The law was set to go into effect as soon as then-President Lagos signed it, which he did weeks later. Justice Minister José Antonio Gómez Urrutia praised both the Chamber of Deputies and Lagos for supporting the measure.

Beginning in 2002, Lagos' government had to face suspicions of political corruption due to the prosecution of one of his ministers, Carlos Cruz, and of other civil employees of the Public Works Ministry, in the denominated MOP-GATE case. Gloria Ana Chevesich, the judge in charge of this case, discovered that ministers, undersecretaries, and other officials of exclusive confidence of the President received additional payments to their regular remuneration: the so-called "extra payments". This irregularity was acknowledged by Lagos, who specified that the practice had also developed during the governments of Frei Ruiz-Tagle and Aylwin. The official position of the government consisted of not acknowledging the criminal nature of these practices and establishing a legal reform that increased the pay of ministers and undersecretaries of the government, a matter that was approved in its legislative proceeding.

Foreign relations

During 2004, Lagos faced a series of tensions in his relation with other South American countries, caused by recurring Bolivian aspirations for access to the sea. This situation was linked with the power crisis taking place in Argentina, an important supplier of natural gas to Chile. In bilateral meetings between Bolivian President Carlos Mesa and Argentine President Néstor Kirchner, the former agreed to the sale of Bolivian gas to Argentina under the condition that "not a single gas molecule be sold to Chile". Additionally, the Venezuelan President, Hugo Chávez, has supported in various instances the Bolivian sea claim, causing a diplomatic impassé between Chile and Venezuela. The tension between both governments had dissipated during July 2004.

Legacy

During Lagos' presidency, Free Trade Agreements were signed with the European Community, the United States, South Korea, the People's Republic of China and New Zealand, Singapore and Brunei (though some of his supporters in the center-left Coalition of Parties for Democracy consider that these agreements may have negative effects on the country); the incidence of extreme poverty was significantly reduced; the legal workweek was reduced from 48 to 45 hours; improvements were made in infrastructure and transport; an unemployment insurance scheme was created; as well as the AUGE health program guaranteeing coverage for a number of medical conditions; the Chile Barrio housing program; the Chile Solidario program; compulsory schooling was extended to 12 years; the first divorce law in Chile was approved; monetary compensation to victims of torture under the Pinochet regime identified in the Valech Report was authorized; and, recently, a recast constitution was signed. He finished his six-year term with a historically high approval rating of 70%.

Post-presidential career

Political
On 24 March 2006 Lagos inaugurated his own foundation called Democracia y Desarrollo ("Democracy and Development") in Santiago. Three days later he began a two-year term as President of the Club de Madrid— an exclusive organization of former presidents created by a Spanish philanthropist to promote democracy across the world. He also assumed co-chairmanship of the Inter-American Dialogue's Board of Directors.

On 2 May 2007 Lagos, along with Gro Harlem Brundtland and Han Seung-soo, was named by UN Secretary-General Ban Ki-moon as a Special Envoy on Climate Change. His appointment was and still is very controversial among Chilean environmental groups who questioned his track record on the matter, claiming that he 'showed an utter lack of consideration for the environment, promoted policies against environmental sustainability and favored the interests of big economic groups, even defending crimes against nature internationally', favouring large corporations every single time there was a clash between local communities, environmental concerns and perceived economic benefits.

On January 14, 2017, Lagos accepted the Party for Democracy's nomination to run for president in 2017. However, he withdrew soon after the Party for Democracy, publicly backed  Alejandro Guillier. Following this he announced his retirement.

Publishing
In early 2007, Lagos became a member of the editorial board of Americas Quarterly, a policy publication focused on relations and development in the Western Hemisphere. Lagos contributes regularly.

Academic
After abandoning power, Lagos taught a one-month special seminar at UC Berkeley's Center for Latin American Studies, called "Democracy and Development in Latin America."

In May 2007, Brown University announced that Lagos would take a teaching position at the Watson Institute for International Studies for a period of five years, starting on July 1, 2007.

In 2013, Lagos was a visiting professor at the University of São Paulo assuming the “José Bonifácio Cátedra".

Styles, honours and arms

National honours
 Grand Master (2000-2006) and Collar of the Order of Merit
 Grand Master (2000-2006) and Collar of the Order of Bernardo O'Higgins

Foreign honours 
  : Knight Grand Cross decorated with Grand Cordon of the Order of Merit of the Italian Republic (3 March 2000)
  : Grand Cross (or 1st Class) of the Order of the White Double Cross (2001)
 : Knight Grand Cross of the Grand Order of King Tomislav ("For outstanding contribution to the promotion of friendship and development co-operation between the Republic of Croatia and the Republic of Chile", 6 February 2004)
  : Knight Collar of the Order of Isabella the Catholic (1 June 2001)
  : Order of the Athir (7 May 2005)
  : On 24 May 2018, he was awarded the Doctor of Laws degree by Harvard University.
: Medal of the Oriental Republic of Uruguay (2002)

Arms

See also
Politics of Chile

References

External links 

Appearances on C-SPAN
Democracy and Development Foundation  
 Extended biography by the CIDOB Foundation 
 BBC Profile: Ricardo Lagos (January 2000)
 Lagos's undergraduate thesis: "The Concentration of Economic Power" 
 The Lagos Legacy and Chile's Upcoming Elections  The Council on Hemispheric Affairs
 Ricardo Lagos Freedom Collection interview

1938 births
Living people
Presidents of Chile
Chilean Ministers of Public Works
Chilean Ministers of Education
Chilean democracy activists
20th-century Chilean economists
Chilean former marxists
Duke University alumni
Duke University faculty
Chilean agnostics
Collars of the Order of Isabella the Catholic
Recipients of the Order of the Star of Romania
Knights Grand Cross with Collar of the Order of Merit of the Italian Republic
University of Chile alumni
University of North Carolina at Chapel Hill faculty
Socialist Party of Chile politicians
Party for Democracy (Chile) politicians
Radical Party of Chile politicians
Politicians from Santiago
Instituto Nacional General José Miguel Carrera alumni
Candidates for President of Chile
Chilean people of Spanish descent
Recipients of the Medal of the Oriental Republic of Uruguay
Brown University faculty
Members of the Inter-American Dialogue
Special Envoys of the Secretary-General of the United Nations